Rosa Souvenir de la Malmaison is a rose cultivar with large, very pale pink, flowers that open flat. The Bourbon rose was created in 1843 by Lyon rose breeder Jean Béluze, who named it after the Château de Malmaison, where Joséphine de Beauharnais (1763–1814) had created a magnificent rose garden. It is probably a cross between 'Mme Desprez' and 'Devoniensis'.

The flowers are quartered and very filled and appear in clusters. They have a moderately strong tea-rose fragrance. Because the flowers are quite solid, they may rot in damp weather.

The light green leaves are large and glossy. The plant has a reputation for lack of winter hardiness (USDA zone 6) and for responding poorly to pruning. In colder, rainier climates, the cultivar can be susceptible to mildew and black spot.

Rose Hall of Fame
In 1988, 'Souvenir de la Malmaison' was added to the Old Rose Hall of Fame by the World Federation of Rose Societies.

Sports and hybrid offspring
There are four known sports: the climber 'Climbing Souvenir de la Malmaison' (Bennett, 1893), the pink form 'Leweson Glower' (Béluze, 1845), the white sport 'Kronprinzessin Viktoria' (Volvert, 1887), named after the oldest daughter (1840–1901) of Queen Victoria, and 'Souvenir de St Anne's' (Hilling, 1950), a semi-double white rose with yellow stamens that had originated in a garden at St Anne's, Clontarf, Dublin.

One of the most famous descendants of 'Souvenir de la Malmaison' is 'Gloire de Dijon' (Jacotot, 1850).

References

Souvenir de la Malmaison